Simon Donald Rupert Neville Lennox-Boyd, 2nd Viscount Boyd of Merton (born 7 December 1939) is a British peer.

Family
The son of Alan Lennox-Boyd, 1st Viscount Boyd of Merton, Lord Boyd was educated at Eton and graduated from Christ Church, Oxford in 1962, with a Bachelor of Arts and in 1966 with a Master of Arts. He was deputy chairman of Arthur Guinness & Sons between 1981 and 1986.

Lord Boyd of Merton married Alice Mary Clive (born March 24, 1942), daughter of the writer Lady Mary Clive, on 24 July 1962. They had four children:

Hon. Charlotte Mary Lennox-Boyd (b. 16 April 1963), married Charles Mitchell in 1992 and had issue;
Hon. Benjamin Alan Lennox-Boyd (b. 21 October 1964), married Shelia Mary Margaret Williams in 1993 and had issue. He is the heir apparent to the present holder's viscountcy and his son Alan George Simon Lennox-Boyd (b. 11 March 1993) is the heir's heir apparent who is named after his great-grandfather.
Hon. Edward George Lennox-Boyd (b. 30 March 1968), married Tamsin Hichens in 1994 and had issue. He changed his name by Deed poll to Edward George Clive on 24 November 1999;
Hon. Philippa Patricia Lennox-Boyd (b. 12 March 1970), married Patrick Spens, 4th Baron Spens, in 1998 and had issue.

Lord Boyd of Merton lived at Ince Castle in Cornwall until 2018, when it was sold.

Arms

References

Person page Simon Lennox-Boyd, 2nd Viscount Boyd of Merton - Website thePeerage.com
Burke's Peerage
Who's Who 2009

External links

1939 births
Living people
People educated at Eton College
Viscounts in the Peerage of the United Kingdom
Boyd of Merton